The 2020 Women's Volleyball North American Olympic Qualification Tournament will be a volleyball tournament for women's national teams to be held in Santo Domingo, Dominican Republic from 10 to 12 January 2020. 4 teams will play in the tournament, where the winner will qualify to the 2020 women's Olympic volleyball tournament.

Qualification
The 2019 NORCECA Champions Cup champions which had not yet qualified to the 2020 Olympic Games and the top three teams from the 2019 NORCECA Championship which had not yet qualified to the 2020 Olympic Games or this tournament qualified for this tournament. Final standings of the 2019 NORCECA Champions Cup or 2019 NORCECA Championship are shown in brackets.

 (2019 NORCECA Champions Cup runners-up)
 (2019 NORCECA Championship 3rd place)
 (2019 NORCECA Championship 4th place)
 (2019 NORCECA Championship 5th place)

Pool standing procedure
 Number of matches won
 Match points
 Points ratio
 Sets ratio
 Result of the last match between the tied teams

Match won 3–0: 5 match points for the winner, 0 match points for the loser
Match won 3–1: 4 match points for the winner, 1 match point for the loser
Match won 3–2: 3 match points for the winner, 2 match points for the loser

Round robin
All times are Atlantic Standard Time (UTC−04:00).

Final standing

See also
Volleyball at the 2020 Summer Olympics – Men's North American qualification

References

External links
Official website – FIVB
Official website – NORCECA

2020 in volleyball
Volleyball qualification for the 2020 Summer Olympics
January 2020 sports events in North America